Abbabis is a disused railway station southwest of Karibib in the Erongo Region of western Namibia on the  dismantled narrow gauge Swakopmund–Windhoek railway line established in 1900.

The etymology of the station is not clear: Either it is from the Khoikhoi language for 'red spot', or from Nama language abas for 'gourd', as in the case of a farm approximately 300 km (200 miles) further south.

Near to the station was a German convalescent home (Genesungsheim), in which the soldiers of the imperial protection force (Schutztruppen) could recover. A ruin of its office building is still visible on a paddock. The soldiers camped in tents and barracks. The rails have long been lifted. The station building has been extended at its front and rear. It is now used as a private residence. The water supply is still from the old well.

References 

Railway stations in Namibia
1900 establishments in German South West Africa
Populated places established in 1900